Muhammad Pasha was an Egyptian Pasha of the Regency of Algiers from 1566. He was the son of the famous Pasha of Algiers Salah Rais. He was active in extending Algiers and building several forts. He was succeeded by Uluç Ali Reis, a famous pirate of Italian origins.

Notes

16th-century Algerian people
Pashas
Rulers of the Regency of Algiers
 16th century in Algiers